I Got Next is the third solo studio album by American musician KRS-One. It was released on May 20, 1997 via Jive Records. Production was handled by Domingo, Jesse West, Showbiz, Gordon "Commissioner Gordon" Williams, DJ Cipher, DJ Muggs, Thembisa, and KRS-One himself. It features guest appearances from Redman, Angie Martinez, Mic Vandalz, Thor-El and Puff Daddy.

In the United States the album peaked at number 3 on the Billboard 200 and number 2 on the Top R&B/Hip-Hop Albums with 94,000 copies sold in its first week. It was certified Gold by the Recording Industry Association of America on July 22, 1997 for selling 500,000 units. The album also made it to No. 18 in Canada, No. 90 in the Netherlands, and No. 95 in Germany.

Track listing

Charts

Weekly charts

Year-end charts

Certifications

References

External links

1997 albums
KRS-One albums
Jive Records albums
Albums produced by KRS-One
Albums produced by DJ Muggs
Albums produced by Showbiz (producer)